Guanine nucleotide-binding protein G(I)/G(S)/G(T) subunit beta-3 is a protein that in humans is encoded by the GNB3 gene.

Heterotrimeric guanine nucleotide-binding proteins ( G proteins), which integrate signals between  receptors and  effector proteins, are composed of an alpha, a beta, and a gamma subunit. These subunits are encoded by families of related genes. This gene encodes a beta subunit. Beta subunits are important regulators of alpha subunits, as well as of certain signal transduction receptors and effectors. A single-nucleotide polymorphism (C825T) in this gene is associated with essential hypertension and obesity. This polymorphism is also associated with the occurrence of the  splice variant GNB3-s, which appears to have increased activity. GNB3-s is an example of alternative splicing caused by a nucleotide change outside of the splice donor and acceptor sites. Additional splice variants may exist for this gene, but they have not been fully described.

References

Further reading